Allart is a surname. Notable people with the surname include:

Alexis Allart (born 1986), French football player
Constant Allart (1796–1861), French politician
Hortense Allart (1801–1879), Italian-French author
Robert Allart (born 1913), Belgian weightlifter

ship
HDMS Allart (1807), originally Danish, captured at the Battle of Copenhagen (1807). Later recaptured by Denmark.